Codie Spearman (January 3, 1898  – January 1965) was an American baseball right fielder in the Negro leagues. He played with the Cleveland Elites in 1926. His brothers, Charlie, Henry, Clyde, and Willie, and nephew Fred all played in the Negro leagues.

References

External links
 and Seamheads
 Codie Spearman at Arkansas Baseball Encyclopedia

1898 births
1965 deaths
Baseball players from Arkansas
Baseball third basemen
Cleveland Elites players
Sportspeople from Arkansas
People from Arkadelphia, Arkansas
20th-century African-American sportspeople
Baseball outfielders